Postal codes in Lithuania since 2005 are 5 digit numeric, ISO 3166-1 alpha-2 prefix is allowed, with that the format is LT-NNNNN.

Previous to 2005 it was NNNN, which was the old Soviet NNNNNN format with the first 2 digits (23) dropped.

See also 
 ISO 3166-2:LT
 Subdivisions of Lithuania
 :lt:Pašto kodas

External links 
 Postal code search tool (old website in English)
 Postal code search tool (new website in Lithuanian)

Lithuania
Postal system of Lithuania